Birsha Munda Memorial College, established in 2010, is a general degree college at Pirrah, Haludkanali, Bankura district, India. It offers undergraduate courses in arts. It is affiliated to Bankura University.

Departments

Arts

Bengali
Santali
History

Accreditation
The college is recognized by the University Grants Commission (UGC).

See also

References

External links
 
 

Colleges affiliated to Bankura University
Universities and colleges in Bankura district
Educational institutions established in 2010
2010 establishments in West Bengal